Laurent may refer to:
Laurent (name), a French masculine given name and a surname
Saint Laurence (aka: Saint Laurent), the martyr Laurent
Pierre Alphonse Laurent, mathematician
Joseph Jean Pierre Laurent, amateur astronomer, discoverer of minor planet (51) Nemausa
Laurent, South Dakota, a proposed town for the Deaf to be named for Laurent Clerc

See also
Laurent series, in mathematics, representation of a complex function f(z) as a power series which includes terms of negative degree, named for Pierre Alphonse Laurent
Saint-Laurent (disambiguation)
Laurence (name), feminine form of "Laurent"
Lawrence (disambiguation)